Alfred Cecil Rowlandson (15 June 1865 – 15 June 1922) was an Australian publisher and bookseller.


Early life

Alfred Cecil Rowlandson was born on 15 June 1865 at Daylesford, Victoria, the second surviving son of Arthur Hodgson Rowlandson, an Indian-born gold-miner, and his wife Susan Sophia (née Black), born in Brechin, Scotland. Alfred C. Rowlandson was educated at the Northcote State School and then, after the family moved to Queensland, at the Superior Normal School, Brisbane. In 1877 he began working as a shop boy.  In 1878 the Rowlandson family moved to Sydney, where Alfred was employed as an office boy in the office of Henry Waddington, of Macquarie-place.

Career
In 1883, at 17, Rowlandson joined the staff of the New South Wales Bookstall Company, and was employed as a tram ticket seller at the office at the corner of King Street and Elizabeth Streets. He was promoted to cashier and then manager. When the proprietor Henry Lloyd died in 1897, Rowlandson bought the business from the widow and conceived the idea of selling Australian books at one shilling each, creating the Bookstall series. In spite of his belief that there was a market for cheap Australian books the prospects were not encouraging. Australians generally had not much faith in the value of the work of their novelists, and it seemed unlikely that books could be sold in large editions in a country with a population still under four million when Rowlandson began publishing at the turn of the century.

Rowlandson and Alma Jenkins were married in 1898 in Sydney.

In late 1904 the N.S.W. Bookstall Co. published Steele Rudd's Sandy’s Selection, for which Rowlandson paid £500 for the publication rights, at that time the largest sum paid in advance for an Australian book.  The unprecedented fee paid to Rudd meant that about twenty thousand copies needed to be sold before a profit could be made.  Rowlandson also spent comparatively large sums in readers' fees, and among the many distinguished artists employed as illustrators were Norman Lindsay, Lionel Lindsay, Percy Lindsay, Ruby Lindsay, David Low, Percy Spence and Will Dyson. He published works by A. H. Adams, J. A. Barry, Louis Becke, Randolph Bedford, E. J. Brady, George Cockerill, Edward Dyson,  Beatrice Grimshaw, Sumner Locke, Vance Palmer, Ambrose Pratt, T. E. Spencer and A. G. Stephens among others. Postcards included paintings by Neville Cayley.  Rowlandson himself may have been the author (as 'Paul Cupid') of a 1909 novel The Rival Physicians.

As a result of increased costs during World War I the copy price of the books was increased to one shilling and threepence, but it was lowered to one shilling again as soon as possible.

Late life and legacy

Rowlandson, who had to work extremely hard to keep control of a business worked on a small margin of profit.  By 1922 it was reported that "for some time" Rowlandson's "health had been unsatisfactory".

In April 1922 Rowlandson, accompanied by his wife and three children, left Sydney on a voyage to North America for the sake of his health.  However, when he arrived at San Francisco Rowlandson was too ill to land.  On the return journey to Australia, when the vessel arrived at Wellington, New Zealand, he was removed to a private hospital to be operated on for appendicitis.  After the operation Rowlandson was reported to have rallied, but diabetic complications set in and he died on 15 June 1922, aged 57 years.

Alfred C. Rowlandson was buried in Gore Hill cemetery, Sydney, leaving a widow, son, daughter and an adopted daughter.

In just over 20 years of publishing, Rowlandson issued around five million copies of books by about 70 authors, illustrated by over 30 artists, and left a name for just dealing not surpassed by any other publisher.

References
 Carol Mills, 'Rowlandson, Alfred Cecil (1865 - 1922)', Australian Dictionary of Biography, Volume 11, MUP, 1988, p. 470. Retrieved 20 November 2009
 

1866 births
1922 deaths
Australian publishers (people)
People from Daylesford, Victoria
Australian booksellers
Burials at Gore Hill Cemetery